Gustaf III Airport , also known as Saint Barthélemy Airport, Rémy de Haenen Airport, sometimes as St. Jean Airport, is a public use airport located in the village of St. Jean on the Caribbean island of Saint Barthélemy.

Due to its very short runway, very close proximity to automotive traffic on a nearby road, and the necessity of a license to land at the airport, The History Channel documentary Most Extreme Airports ranked it the third most dangerous airport in the world, behind Toncontín International Airport and Lukla Airport.

Overview
Both the airport and the island's main town of Gustavia are named after King Gustav III of Sweden, under whom Sweden obtained the island from France in 1784 (it was sold back to France in 1878). In 1984, the Swedish Minister of Communications, Hans Gustafsson, inaugurated the terminal building of the Gustaf III Airport. In 2015 the airport got the name Aéroport de Saint-Barthélemy-Rémy-de-Haenen, named after Rémy de Haenen, an aviation pioneer and later .

The airport is served by small regional commercial aircraft and charters. Most visiting aircraft carry fewer than twenty passengers, such as the Twin Otter, a common sight throughout the northern West Indies and as a curiosity, the Canadian-built de Havilland Dash 7 is the largest aircraft ever allowed to operate at this airport. The short airstrip is at the base of a gentle slope ending directly on the beach. The arrival descent is extremely steep over the hilltop traffic circle; departing planes fly right over the heads of sunbathers (although small signs advise sunbathers not to lie directly at the end of the runway). The airport is located at the island's second-largest town, St. Jean. The most common aircraft flying in for commercial service are the Pilatus PC-12, Cessna 208B Grand Caravan, de Havilland DHC-6 Twin Otter, and Britten-Norman BN-2 Islander.

Airlines and destinations

Passenger

Cargo

Statistics

References

External links

Airports in Saint Barthélemy
Gustav III
Airports established in 1984
1984 establishments in France
1984 establishments in North America